Murder in Crown Passage is a 1937 detective novel by the British writer Cecil Street, writing under the pen name of Miles Burton. It is the sixteenth in a series of books featuring the amateur detective Desmond Merrion and Inspector Arnold of Scotland Yard. Street was one of the most prolific authors of the Golden Age of Detective Fiction. It was published in the United States by Doubleday the same year under the alternative title  The Man with the Tattooed Face. As often in the series, the setting is in rural England.

Synopsis
The small country town of Faston Bishop is rocked when a body is discovered in Crown Passage just off the High Street. The man is a casual labourer recently arrived in the area, but nobody has any idea why anyone should want to murder him. Arnold is called in to investigate and soon seeks the assistance of his fried Merrion. Arnold's attempts to pin the crime on a local couple of shopkeepers, is challenged by Merrion who believes it has its roots miles away in London's Docklands.

References

Bibliography
 Evans, Curtis. Masters of the "Humdrum" Mystery: Cecil John Charles Street, Freeman Wills Crofts, Alfred Walter Stewart and the British Detective Novel, 1920-1961. McFarland, 2014.
 Magill, Frank Northen . Critical Survey of Mystery and Detective Fiction: Authors, Volume 3. Salem Press, 1988.
 Reilly, John M. Twentieth Century Crime & Mystery Writers. Springer, 2015.

1937 British novels
Novels by Cecil Street
British mystery novels
British detective novels
Collins Crime Club books
Novels set in London